The Streleț Cabinet was the Cabinet of Moldova from 30 July to 29 October 2015. It consisted of ministers from the Liberal Democratic Party (PLDM), the Democratic Party (PDM) and the Liberal Party (PL), who together formed the Alliance for European Integration III. The Cabinet was installed after a successful vote of confidence held in the Parliament of Moldova on 30 July 2015. It was dismissed by Parliament on 29 October amid ongoing protests, lasting 3 months. A new cabinet was formed only on 20 January 2016; until then the Deputy Prime Minister for Social Affairs Gheorghe Brega was acting Prime Minister.

History
After that, on 12 June 2015, when the former Prime Minister Chiril Gaburici announced his resignation, followed by the resignation of the entire Gaburici Cabinet, the three pro-European parliamentary parties, LDPM, DPM and LP formed the Alliance for European Integration III and agreed to form a new government. Although for the post of prime minister was initially proposed Maia Sandu, was eventually named liberal-democrat Valeriu Streleț.
In the new government, as compared to the previous Cabinet Gaburici, LDPM and DPM have given up some ministries that have passed to subordination of the LP, a new vice minister's portfolio was set up, which will deal with social issues and return LP, and the LDPM and LP have made a castling with the Ministry of Health and the Ministry of Labor, Social Protection and Family, together with the ministers, Mircea Buga and Ruxanda Glavan. On 29 October 2015 the Government of Streleţ was dismissed by a motion of no confidence. Thus, all ministers entered the interim function, fulfilling only the functions of managing public affairs, until the appointment of a new Cabinet of Ministers. The motion of no confidence of the Streleț Cabinet was filed in Parliament on 22 October (2015), being signed by 42 PSRM and PCRM deputies, its basis being "suspicions of corruption" and "the detachment of the prime minister from his office by exposing in favor of Vladimir Filat. After that parliamentary session was closed for lack of quorum, the motion would be examined at the next meeting on 29 October. To dismiss the government, a simple majority was needed: the vote of 51 out of 101 deputies. At the meeting of October 29, Streleţ government was dismissed with the vote of 65 deputies of the factions of the DPM, PCRM and PSRM, only 18 LDPM deputies voted against.

Composition 

The Cabinet consisted of the Prime Minister of Moldova Valeriu Streleț, four Deputy Prime Ministers, 14 other ministers, and two ex officio members.

Ministers

Ex officio members 

The Başkan (Governor) of Gagauzia is elected by universal, equal, direct, secret and free suffrage on an alternative basis for a term of 4 years. One and the same person can be a governor for no more than two consecutive terms. The Başkan of Gagauzia is confirmed as a member of the Moldovan government by a decree of the President of Moldova.

References 

 

Moldova cabinets
Coalition governments
2015 establishments in Moldova
Cabinets established in 2015